The Great Range is a mountain range in the Adirondack Mountains, near Keene Valley, New York, United States. It rises in the heart of the High Peaks region between Ausable Lakes to the southeast and the Johns Brook Valley to the northwest.

They are, along the main ridge from northeast to southwest, Lower Wolfjaw, Upper Wolfjaw, Armstrong, Gothics, Saddleback, Basin, and Haystack.

Sawteeth is a spur of Gothics, and Marcy is often associated with the Great Range but it is not an "historical" part of the Great Range. Other peaks have sometimes been associated with the Great Range but they don't meet the criteria of being in a "range".

References 

Adirondack High Peaks
Landforms of Essex County, New York
Mountain ranges of New York (state)